The New Bob Cummings Show is an American sitcom which was broadcast by CBS during the 1961–62 television season. The series was originally titled The Bob Cummings Show when it first appeared on the CBS schedule on October 5, 1961; however, this led to confusion between this program and series stars Bob Cummings' earlier 1955 series, also called The Bob Cummings Show; thus, the title The New Bob Cummings Show was officially adopted beginning with the December 28 episode.

Synopsis
The New Bob Cummings Show began two years after production had ended on Cummings' previous, successful sitcom The Bob Cummings Show, which, when the newer program began its run, was still being rerun on ABC's daytime schedule under the title Love That Bob, which it was to retain through many years in syndication.

The new program, like its predecessor, took advantage of Cummings' real-life interests; once again, the character he played, Bob Carson, was a pilot.  Carson owned two planes, a conventional, twin-engine plane which he used for long trips, and the Aerocar, which, as its name implied, was a vehicle which could be alternately flown or, with its wing detached, driven on highways as an automobile, which he used for short hops near his California base.

In addition to his activities as a charter pilot, Carson was an amateur detective, a fact which provided the basis for the plots of most of the episodes.  In contrast to Cummings earlier program, which had several co-stars, the only recurring roles in The New Bob Cummings Show other than Cummings' own were that of "Lionel", Carson's bodyguard, played by Murvyn Vye, and "Hank", the tomboyish-yet-precocious teenage daughter of the owner of the airstrip where Carson's planes were based, played by Roberta Shore.

Production
When The Bob Cummings Show ended, Cummings said he was not keen to do comedy for his next series. However The New Bob Cummings Show was very much in the same vein as the first one.

The show was announced in April 1961. The network said Cummings' character would do anything that was not "illegal, immoral or underpaid".

It was filmed by Revue Productions and sponsored by the Kellogg Company and Brown & William Tobacco. The show replaced Dick Powell's Zane Grey Theatre on the network line up.

Episodes

Reception
The show aired on Thursday nights opposite two popular shows, The Real McCoys on ABC and Dr. Kildare on NBC.

The New York Times said "the style but not the setting is about the same as his past series... Fast talk, pretty girls and breezy comedy are still the main ingredients. It's bright, quick, inconsequential and inoffensive."

Cancellation
Two months after the show debuted in October the title was changed to The New Bob Cummings Show. Ratings did not improve and the show was cancelled in January. The last episode aired on March 1, 1962. It was replaced by Oh! Those Bells.

References

External links
 

1961 American television series debuts
1962 American television series endings
1960s American sitcoms
Black-and-white American television shows
CBS original programming
English-language television shows
Aviation television series
Television series by Universal Television
Television shows set in California